Johal is a village in Jalandhar district of Punjab, India. It lies in Jalandhar East Tehsil at distance of 6 Kilometers from Jalandhar.

Nearby
Jandu Singha, Bolina and Kangniwal are the nearby villages to Johala. Jalandhar, Kartarpur, Phagwara, Adampur are the nearby Cities to Johal.

References

Villages in Jalandhar district